Death at the Bar is a crime novel by Ngaio Marsh, the ninth to feature her series detective Chief Detective-Inspector Roderick Alleyn of Scotland Yard. Published in 1940 by Collins (UK) and Little, Brown (USA), it was adapted for television in 1993 as part of the Inspector Alleyn Mysteries. The episode was directed by Michael Winterbottom and starred Patrick Malahide as Roderick Alleyn. The novel's title is a pun on the legal term the bar, and the public house as the plot concerns the murder of a leading KC (King's Counsel, or barrister-at-law) during a game of darts in the bar of a pub in a small South Devon village. The novel is (unusually) dated on its final page 'May 3, 1939, New Zealand'; so despite its publication after the start of World War Two, the story is clearly set before the war, in Spring 1939.

Plot
Luke Watchman, a top London barrister and King's Counsel, holidays in the fictional village of Ottercombe, South Devon, staying for a second year at the village pub, The Plume of Feathers, with his cousin Sebastian Parish, a West End actor, and their good friend Norman Cubitt, a painter. Ottercombe is a small, self-contained, picturesque fishing village, accessible only by a narrow road and foot tunnel. The Feathers is run by Abel Pomeroy and his son Will, who is an enthusiastic Communist, much involved in the recently formed Coombe Left Movement.  The CLM has acquired recent arrival in town Bob Legge (who lives at the pub) as its treasurer and secretary. Also staying at the Feathers is Hon. Violet Darragh, a middle-aged, hard-up Anglo-Irish aristocrat and amateur watercolorist. The cast of suspects is completed by Decima Moore, a local farmer's daughter recently graduated from Oxford University, who has an understanding with Will Pomeroy, based on their shared left-wing views, and with whom Watchman is eager to rekindle a brief fling from the previous year.

The evening after Watchman's arrival, Bob Legge strikes the lawyer's finger with a dart while performing a trick and Watchman dies suddenly of cyanide poisoning, a particularly toxic rat poison used earlier in the pub's garage. How the cyanide entered Watchman's body is unknown since, although there are traces of the poison on the dart, it doesn't seem as if anyone could have tampered with until after the fact.  The police attention then turns to some brandy Watchman drank that was given to him by Decima to calm his nerves after the dart hit him.

Alleyn, with Inspector Fox, travels to Ottercombe at the request of Abel Pomeroy to investigate the murder. The Feathers's reputation is at stake because the inquest was inconclusive and some patrons believe Watchman was poisoned by Pomeroy's neglect.  Alleyn rapidly detects the usual welter of motives, and the case seems to revolve around an old fraud trial, in which Watchman successfully defended Lord Bryonie by suggesting he was the gullible pawn of Montague Thringle, who was convicted and given a severe prison sentence. Before Alleyn can unmask Watchman's killer, in the face of considerable obstruction or outright hostility from the suspects, he only just contrives to save his assistant Inspector Fox from death by drinking cyanide-laced sherry from a bottle set aside for the two policemen.

With Fox recovering quickly, Alleyn unmasks the killer: Bob Legge.  Legge is Montague Thringle who blames Watchman for his lengthy prison stay.  Watchman failed to recognize Legge, whose appearance has changed drastically, but Legge recognized him.  While anyone could have poisoned the brandy or the dart after it was thrown, only Legge would have known that dart would pierce Watchman's finger when he deliberately missed the shot.  Legge poisoned neither the dart nor the brandy but the iodine used to clean out Watchman's wound.

Characters
Chief Inspector Roderick Alleyn
Inspector Fox
Luke Watchman - a successful young barrister
Sebastian Parish - Luke's actor cousin
Norman Cubitt - Luke's painter friend
Abel Pomeroy - proprietor of the Plume of Feathers
Will Pomeroy - his son
Decima Moore - the local farmer's daughter; engaged to Will Pomeroy
Violet Darragh - an impoverished Irish aristocrat
Bob Legge - Treasurer and Secretary for the Coombe Left Movement
George Nark - local drunkard
Mrs. Ives - housekeeper at the Plume of Feathers

Background and commentary
In her autobiography Black Beech And Honeydew, Ngaio Marsh describes Marton Cottage, the home in the hills outside Christchurch (NZ) she shared with her widowed father, as "a masculine household... with the emphasis on my father's generation", who would gather there of an evening to play darts. According to Marsh biographer Joanne Drayton, by April 1938, Marsh had returned to Christchurch after a long 1937-8 visit to England, where she had spent time with her old friends, the Rhodes family, visiting Devon and Cornwall, including Polperro (on which she drew for her fictional Ottercombe), adding to Death At The Bar her knowledge of the darts games her father Henry Marsh enjoyed, in which Ngaio sometimes took part.

While sitting firmly within the traditional Golden Age whodunit formula at which Ngaio Marsh was such an expert - the 'cosy' English setting, the closed circle of suspects, the orthodox class structure, the exotic murder method etc. - Death At the Bar has some unusual features as well as some familiar Marsh characteristics. We have the quaint West Country dialect that crops up in some of her books (cf Dead Water), the knowledgeable presentation of professional actors and painters (Marsh having impressive and extensive experience of both, throughout her life) and, unusually for a 1930s whodunit, the development of a theme around Left Wing politics and a local communist group, as well as a (for the period) unorthodox discussion of the rights and wrongs of capital punishment.

At this point in the Alleyn saga (Spring 1939), we learn that he is 43 to Fox's 50 years old, and that Alleyn is now happily married to the painter Agatha Troy (who is mentioned only briefly). The novel omits altogether Alleyn's former customary 'Watson', the journalist Nigel Bathgate. The 'Watson' role is partly played in the novel by the local Chief Constable, Colonel the Hon. Maxwell Brammington, who is thoroughly eccentric and shares the affected speech of such other Marsh characters as the playwright John Rutherford in Opening Night.

References

Roderick Alleyn novels
1940 British novels
Novels set in Devon
William Collins, Sons books
British detective novels